A clef is a musical symbol used to indicate the pitch of written notes.

Clef may also refer to:
 Clef Records, an American record label
 Clefs, Maine-et-Loire, a village in France,
 The Clefs, an Australian band
 Cross Language Evaluation Forum (CLEF), organization promoting research in multilingual information access
 Treble-clef, a type of zinc finger in molecular biology

See also
 Key (disambiguation)
 Cleft (disambiguation)